Joshua Emanuel Baez (born June 28, 2003) is a Dominican–American professional baseball outfielder in the St. Louis Cardinals organization.

Early life and amateur career
Baez was born in Boston, Massachusetts, and moved to Santo Domingo as an infant where he was raised before he and his family moved back to Boston and into the neighborhood of Dorchester when he was in sixth grade. He knew no English and used Google Translate to communicate. He began his high school career at Cristo Rey Boston High School and transferred to Snowden International School as a sophomore where he threw up to 97 miles per hour as a pitcher while also batting .442 with twenty RBIs and 11 stolen bases.

Prior to his junior year, Baez transferred to Dexter Southfield School. He was named the Massachusetts Gatorade Baseball Player of the Year as a junior in 2020, despite there being no season due to the COVID-19 pandemic, due to his work ethic and potential. In a shortened 2021 season in which he appeared in 16 games, he hit .378 with three home runs alongside pitching to a 1.94 ERA and 44 strikeouts over 18 innings. He committed to play college baseball at Vanderbilt University.

Professional career
Baez was selected by the St. Louis Cardinals in the second round with the 54th overall selection of the 2021 Major League Baseball draft. He signed with the Cardinals for $2.25 million. He made his professional debut in early August with the Rookie-level Florida Complex League Cardinals. Over 76 at-bats, Baez hit .158 with two home runs, eight RBIs, three doubles, 28 strikeouts, and 14 walks.

Baez began the 2022 season in extended spring training. In mid-May, he was assigned to the Palm Beach Cardinals of the Class A Florida State League. After one game, he was placed on the injured list with a left wrist sprain. He rehabbed with in the Florida Complex League and then returned to play in mid-August. Over 32 games between the two teams, he batted .267 with four home runs, 21 RBIs, and ten stolen bases.

References

External links

2003 births
Living people
Florida Complex League Cardinals players